Michel Quarez (28 May 1938 – 8 December 2021) was a French painter and poster artist.

Biography
He also studied in Warsaw under Henryk Tomaszewski. In 1967, he illustrated Mod Love, a comic book written by Michael Lutin. In 2011, musician  used these images for his album Mondo Beyondo. In 1968, Quarez illustrated another comic strip, La Vita Privata di Dyane.

Following in Quarez's footsteps, Pierre Bernard and  studied in Warsaw and later co-founded Grapus together. Quarez joined the organization, but his differences with the group caused him to leave after three years. His works were characterized by large, colorful shapes.

Michel Quarez died on 8 December 2021 at the age of 83.

References

1938 births
2021 deaths
People from Damascus
20th-century French painters
French poster artists